The Santa Monica road race course was an American race track consisting of public roads.  Established by a consortium of Southern California auto dealers who sought to promote cars, buying them as well as racing them, at a time when they were rather rare in Los Angeles, the Santa Monica road races lasted for ten years.

Inaugural event
An estimated 50,000 people attended the 1909 Santa Monica road races.  Harris Hanshue was the winner of the heavy-car division in an Apperson Jackrabbit and Bert Dingley won the lightweight division in a Chalmers-Detroit Forty.

1912 races
The free-for-all race of the 1912 event was won by Teddy Tetzlaff in a Fiat.  He was awarded a medal for the win.

Vanderbilt Cup and American Grand Prize
Santa Monica hosted both the Vanderbilt Cup and the American Grand Prize in 1914 and in 1916.  A fatality occurred in practice for the 1914 event when a car crashed into the crowd and killed a spectator.  The 1916 event was marred by a total of five deaths: After a mechanician had been fatally injured in practice, driver Lewis Jackson and three people lining the road died as a result of a crash during the Grand Prix race.

Final race
A record crowd of 150,000 people saw millionaire sportsman Cliff Durant drive his Chevrolet Special to victory on a shortened course in 1919.  Walter Melcher sustained fatal injuries when his car overturned.

Further reading
 Osmer, Harold L.; Harms, Phil E. (April 16, 1999). Real Road Racing: The Santa Monica Road Races. Chatsworth, California: Harold L. Osmer Publishing. . Book on the history of the Santa Monica road races.

References

Defunct motorsport venues in the United States
Motorsport venues in California
Sports venues in Los Angeles County, California
Sports in Santa Monica, California